Peyghan Chayi Rural District is in the Central District of Kaleybar County, East Azerbaijan province, Iran. At the National Census of 2006, its population was 5,981 in 1,308 households. There were 5,848 inhabitants in 1,547 households at the following census of 2011. At the most recent census of 2016, the population of the rural district was 5,452 in 1,776 households. The largest of its 50 villages was Peyghan, with 741 people.

References 

Kaleybar County

Rural Districts of East Azerbaijan Province

Populated places in East Azerbaijan Province

Populated places in Kaleybar County